Beechwood is a private estate in Runcorn, England. Situated on the border between Runcorn and Frodsham, it was developed as part of the new town initiative in the 1960s. Although most of Runcorn is heavily industrialised, its Beechwood and Sandymoor estates bear more of a resemblance to Frodsham due to their affluency and rural suburban lifestyles, characterised by detached and semi-detached houses, green open spaces, and nature trails. It has two primary schools, a shop, a pub, a community centre, and a church shared by Anglicans and Methodists.

Gallery

See also
Sandymoor, a similarly affluent estate in Runcorn

References

Runcorn